William Kanu Muluya is the head coach of Kenyan Premier League side F.C. Kariobangi Sharks.

Career
He started his coaching career at Mathare Youth Sports Association before serving as the team manager and assistant coach of Mathare United for four-and-a-half years from 2012. He then joined F.C. Kariobangi Sharks in June 2016 as head coach while the club featured in the Kenyan second-tier National Super League season.

In his first year as coach, Muluya led Kariobangi Sharks to promotion to the 2017 Kenyan Premier League, and has won several titles with the club including the domestic GOtv Shield in 2018, Kenyan Super Cup in 2018–19, SportPesa Super Cup and SportPesa Trophy against Everton F.C. in 2019, as well as qualify the club for continental football.

He was named the 2014 team manager of the year while at Mathare United and won the Kenyan Premier League coach of the year in 2017.

Honors

Club
Kariobangi Sharks
 Kenyan Nationwide League runners-up: 2016
 GOtv Shield champion: 2018; runners-up: 2017, 2019
 Kenyan Super Cup champion: 2018–19
 SportPesa Super Cup champion: 2019
 SportPesa Trophy champion: 2019

Individual
 Kenyan Premier League Coach of the Year: 2017 (Kariobangi Sharks)
 Kenyan Premier League Team manager of the Year: 2014 (Mathare United)

References

External links
 

1986 births
Living people
Kenyan footballers
Kenyan football managers